Carpenter station is a SEPTA Regional Rail station in Philadelphia, Pennsylvania. Located at 201 Carpenter Lane, it serves the Chestnut Hill West Line.

The historic station building has been listed in the Philadelphia Register of Historic Places since August 6, 1981. It is in zone 2 on the Chestnut Hill West Line, on former Pennsylvania Railroad tracks, and is 9.8 track miles from Suburban Station. In fiscal 2012, this station saw 371 boardings on an average weekday.

Station layout

References

External links
SEPTA – Carpenter Station
2000 Kevin Leary Photo
Carpenter Lane Station (Philadelphia Architects and Building) 
 Carpenter Lane entrance from Google Maps Street View

SEPTA Regional Rail stations
Former Pennsylvania Railroad stations
Philadelphia Register of Historic Places
Railway stations in the United States opened in 1884
Railway stations in Philadelphia